The Ironmaster (French: Le maître de forges) is a 1948 French drama film directed by Fernand Rivers and starring Hélène Perdrière, Jean Chevrier and Jeanne Provost.

The film's sets were designed by the art directors Robert Giordani and René Renoux.

Cast
 Hélène Perdrière as Claire de Beaulieu  
 Jean Chevrier as Philippe Derblay  
 Jeanne Provost as Marquise de Beaulieu  
 Luce Feyrer as Athénais Moulinet  
 Marcel Vallée as Moulinet  
 François Richard as Duc de Bligny

References

Bibliography 
 Goble, Alan. The Complete Index to Literary Sources in Film. Walter de Gruyter, 1999.

External links 
 

1948 drama films
French drama films
1948 films
1940s French-language films
Films based on French novels
Films based on works by Georges Ohnet
Films directed by Fernand Rivers
Remakes of French films
French black-and-white films
1940s French films